Deinocroton is an extinct genus of tick. It is known from two species found in Burmese amber, dating to the earliest part of the Cenomanian stage of the Late Cretaceous, around 99 million years ago. Amongst the oldest ticks known, it is distinct from the main two living families of ticks, Ixodidae (hard bodied) and Argasidae (soft bodied), as well as Nuttalliella, and has been placed in the monotypic family Deinocrotonidae.

Taxonomy 
Two species have been named, D. draculi and D. copia, both from Burmese amber, which dates to the late Albian-early Cenomanian stages of the Cretaceous period, around 100 million years ago.

Etymology 
The name of the genus Deinocroton is composed of two words from the ancient Greek "deinos", "terrible", and "krotṓn", "krotṓn", "tick". The name of the species draculi refers to the vampire Count Dracula from the epistolary novel Dracula by British writer Bram Stoker.

Description 
Deinocroton is distinguished from other ticks by a suite of characters relating to the structure of its integument, the morphology of the palps, and the preanal groove shape. The surface of the body is densely pitted with deep pits, and eyes are absent.

Ecology 
The strongly pitted surface of the body and large volume increase (8.5x) of engorged females suggests that the feeding behaviour was most similar to living soft bodied ticks and Nuttalliella, with a rapid engorgement time (minutes to hours), and multiple gonotrophic cycles. The preferred hosts have been inferred to be feathered dinosaurs, based on the association of known specimens with feathers in amber. The specimens were found associated with hastisetae, specialised hair of dermestid beetle larvae, which suggests that they inhabited nests.

Relationships 
The initial describing paper assumed a sister relationship with Nuttalliella, based on several apparently shared characters, though this was in absence of cladistic analysis.

References 

Cretaceous insects of Asia
Ticks
Burmese amber